Coleophora flavipennella is a moth of the family Coleophoridae. It was described by Philogène Auguste Joseph Duponchel in 1843 and is found in Europe.

The forewing is plain yellow-brown. The antenna white ringed fuscous from base to beyond half length of flagellum. Only reliably identified by dissection and microscopic examination of the genitalia. The moth flies from July to August depending on the location.

The larvae feed on sweet chestnut (Castanea sativa), sessile oak (Quercus petraea), pedunculate oak (Quercus robur) and northern red oak (Quercus rubra). Young larvae make a tiny blotch mine and then create a leaf case from the mined leaf fragment. Later this first case is enlarged with silk. The small leaf fragment remains part of the case. Full-grown larvae can be found in May.

References

External links
 
 Coleophora flavipennella at UKMoths

flavipennella
Moths described in 1843
Moths of Europe
Taxa named by Philogène Auguste Joseph Duponchel